Casetas is a borough of Zaragoza (Spain) located 15 km west of the city.

Management

Casetas is a population entity that is 14 km (9 mi) from Zaragoza, its administrative capital. From July 1, 1879 by decision of the City Council of the former town of Las Casetas, this place began to be a neighborhood of the city of Zaragoza. Nowadays it is the most populated neighborhood of the 14 rural neighborhoods that the city has.
Casetas is situated in the northwest corner of the municipality of Zaragoza, at 215 m (705 ft) of altitude, it borders Sobradiel on the north, Garrapinillos on the south, Utebo on the east and Pinseque, Alagón and La Joyosa on the west. The municipal term of Casetas has an area of 3.15 km2 (1.22 sq mi). The mayor of Casetas is Mr. José Luis Román Escuer.

Demography

Casetas had a population of 7,605 inhabitants in 2010. The population of Casetas grew in the 20th century because of the construction of the railway train and the building of an Opel factory in the 1980s. Due to the arrival of foreign population, Casetas's population grew in the 21st century.

Demographic developments in the 18th and 19th centuries

Demographic developments in the 20th and 21st centuries

Foreign population by country of origin

Culture

Casetas has three schools, a high school, a day centre for the elderly', a youth club', a ludoteca, pools and a sports complex. Casetas has a long musical tradition, because many bands were formed there, like Pedro Botero, Se abre la veda, Zirrosis Kronica and La Cap Deleite.

Festivities

 La Virgen de la Rosa (first Sunday of May)
 San Miguel (September 29)

References
 Website of Casetas
 Casetas Neighborhood Association website
 Casetas Sports Union website

Zaragoza